The Elonex ONEt is a netbook computer marketed to the education sector in the UK by Elonex. Inspired by the OLPC initiative, the low cost of the ONE, the ONEt and similar devices, made this subnotebook seem an attractive proposition for educators seeking to provide every child with a highly functional laptop computer. However initial ONEt trials by educators claimed that the lack of security, specifically the absence of any password protection at start-up, put personal information at risk, making it unsuitable for use in a school environment. It was released in September 2008, on sale to the general public, marketed as an upgrade to the ONE. It has Wi-Fi connectivity, a solid-state hard drive, three USB ports and an SD card slot.

Hardware
The hardware specifications published on 9 July 2008:

Processor, Main Memory
 Ingenic JZ4730 JzRisc Processor (incorporates the XBurst CPU core)
 On-board 1 GB Flash Memory, (2 GB in t+ model)
 128 MiB RAM

Dimensions
 Display:  LCD display; 800×480 px Widescreen
 Dimension (w.× l.×h.): 21×14×3 cm
 Weight: 625 g

Networking
 Wi-Fi
 Ethernet

Peripherals, Ports 
 3 USB ports
 Ethernet-over-twisted-pair network port
 2 built-in speakers
 Audio in & out
 SD Card slot

Battery
 Li ion 7.2 V 2.1 Ah - approximately 3 hours usage

Energy Consumption
 Approximately 4.5 W

Operating System
The Elonex OneT has a Linux (mipsel) based operating system, and the included software comprises Sky Word (Abiword 2.4.5), Sky Table (Gnumeric 1.6.3), a PDF viewer (ePDFView 0.1.6), Scientific Calculator, Dictionary, File Manager, Web Browser (BonEcho/Firefox), Email client (Sylpheed),  Sky Chatting (Pidgin), FBReader, Media Player (xine based), Xip Flash Player, Image Gallery, Paint Brush, and Sound Recorder.

Although access to the root filing system isn't possible through the included file manager it is possible to get console access as user root by installing the Xterm application from the CnM Lifestyle website. The CnM Lifestyle notebook is exactly the same as the Elonex OneT and so all applications on this page can be installed.
(To browse the raw file system, the web browser will respond appropriately to being told to load file://127.0.0.1; obviously, this is read-only access.)

Similar devices 
The ONEt is similar to the CnM Mini-book from Maplin Electronics, Alpha 400 product from Bestlink or the Trendtac EPC 700 or the Skytone Alpha 400. Those devices are basically all the same and only have different OEM names.

References

External links
 Loads of guidance for the ONEt and similar machines
 Blog, prices, news, how-to on Alpha 400 and all 400-MHz MIPS mini-laptops.
 Elonex ONEt Review UK

Netbooks